RAAF Base East Sale  is a Royal Australian Air Force (RAAF) military air base and training school, located in , Victoria, Australia. The base is one of the main training establishments of the RAAF, including where Australian Air Force Cadets from 4 Wing (Victoria) have their biannual General Service Training as well as being home to No. 409 Squadron Australian Air Force Cadets. It is home to The Roulettes aerobatic team. It is also now the home of the RAAF's Officers' Training School (OTS) following its relocation from Point Cook Base. East Sale was upgraded to house the new OTS, which had its first intake of students in January 2008. The base houses approximately 700 air force personnel.

History
RAAF Base East Sale opened as a training base on 22 April 1943. Initially, the base was home to No.1 Operational Training Unit (1 OTU) equipped with Bristol Beaufort light bomber aircraft, relocated from airfields at West Sale and Bairnsdale. The base was primarily responsible for training air crew, but units from East Sale also operated in some convoy protection and maritime surveillance roles. Over 3,000 aircrew were trained at the base between its opening and the end of World War II. In addition to the Beauforts, a variety of different aircraft types were operated from the base during this time, including the Lockheed Hudson on which future Prime Minister of Australia Gough Whitlam undertook training as a navigator. Other types used by 1 OTU included Airspeed Oxfords and Fairey Battles.

Following the war, the RAAF Central Flying School was relocated from RAAF Base Point Cook to East Sale in 1947. By 1953, the school had received its first De Havilland Vampire jet aircraft. In 1962, four Vampire jets from CFS at East Sale formed "The Red Sales" aerobatic display team. However while practising aerobatic routines on 15 August, all four Red Sales crashed in formation after failing to recover from a manoeuvre, killing six Central Flying School staff. Six months later, a second display team, "The Telstars" was formed, also flying Vampires and later Aermacchi MB-326 (Macchi) jets. The display team was disbanded in May 1968 due to budget constraints and a shortage of available Macchi airframes. To celebrate the 50th anniversary of the Royal Australian Air Force, the current Roulettes aerobatic display team was formed in 1970, initially operating Macchi MB-326s.

On 24 November 1987, the first two of 67 Pilatus PC-9 aircraft for the RAAF arrived at East Sale. This would become the primary aircraft used by the Central Flying School until the present.

On 1 July 1989, 32 Squadron – formerly a bomber and reconnaissance unit during World War II – was reactivated at East Sale and equipped with Hawker Siddeley HS 748s. These aircraft were operated on general transport and training duties, including RAAF Navigator and Airborne Electronics Analyst training, and Royal Australian Navy Observer training. By June 2004, the squadron had completed conversion to new Beechcraft King Air 350 equipment.

In 1992, the RAAF restructured its flight training programs, handing responsibility for ab-initio training and screening to civilian contractors and retiring its fleet of CT-4 aircraft. Central Flying School operates four BAe-owned CT-4s for training military flight instructors.

In 2000 the nearby Dutson Bombing Range ceased to be used for bombing practice.

In 2015 the RAAF announced that Basic Flight Training would be returning to East Sale in 2019 with Lockheed Martin selected to provide support for this new program using Pilatus PC-21 aircraft that will replace the current PC-9 fleet. Until this time BAE will continue to provide support to the existing training program in Tamworth.

Today it remains the RAAF's primary training base, operating continuously in this role since 1943.

During the 2019–2020 Australian bushfire season the base was being used to assist with firefighting and relief operations. Many aircraft deployed to the base, including Australian Army S-70 Blackhawk, MRH-90 Taipan and CH-47 Chinook helicopters, RSAF CH-47s, New Zealand NH-90s and RAAF C-27J Spartans.

Units

Accidents and incidents
On 27 December 1943, Fairey Battle L5789 of Air Gunnery School West Sale, piloted by Flight Sergeant Lindsay Pynor White, was involved in some air to air gunnery drogue training. The aircraft was flying low along the Seaspray Beach section of Ninety Mile Beach with the target drogue attached when the drogue hit a fisherman's rod which was implanted in the sand. The drogue and lead weight became detached from the drogue cable. The Fairey Battle then proceeded along the beach some 400 yards with the cable snaking along the sand. The cable struck and injured a number of civilians on the beach at Seaspray.

Those civilians injured on Seaspray Beach were as follows:-

16 year old Miss Noreen Cullen of Sale had both feet severed above the ankles. Sixty year old Hector Ernest Luxford of Sale had his right foot above the ankle and his left foot severely gashed and practically severed. Miss Annette Plant of Sale received an injured left leg. Miss Doreen McFadyen of Sale received an injured left toe. 13 year old Percy Orchard of Sale received injuries to his hand and cuts and abrasions to his legs. Mr. Rowland care of Leslies, Sale, suffered slight abrasions to his left leg.

Noreen Cullen and Hector Luxford were taken to Nicholls Cottage at Seaspray, waiting the completion of Blood Serum transfusion before their transfer to the Gippsland District Hospital for further blood transfusions and admission.

In 1962, four Vampire jets from CFS at East Sale formed "The Red Sales" aerobatic display team. However while practising aerobatic routines on 15 August, all four Red Sales crashed in formation after failing to recover from a manoeuvre, killing six Central Flying School staff.

The aircraft stalled after an asymmetric flight condition was mishandled, causing an unrecoverable loss of control. All five RAAF crew were killed in the accident.

See also
 List of airports in Victoria
 List of Royal Australian Air Force installations

References

External links

RAAF Base East Sale official site

Royal Australian Air Force bases
Military installations in Victoria (Australia)
Sale, Victoria
Airports in Victoria (Australia)
Military airbases established in 1943
1943 establishments in Australia